Here and Now may refer to:

Music
 Here & Now (band), an English progressive/space rock band
 Here and Now Tour, a series of concert tours

Albums

 Here and Now (The Jazztet album) (1962)
 Here and Now (Hampton Hawes album) (1965)
 Here & Now!, a 1965 album by George Shearing
 Hear and Now (album), a 1975 album by the Butts Band
 Hear & Now (Don Cherry album) (1976)
 Here and Now (Tchukon album), a 1987 album by Tchukon
 Hear & Now (Billy Squier album) (1989)
 Here and Now (The Wilkinsons album) (2000)
 Here and Now (Ike Turner album) (2001)
 Here & Now: The Best of Human Nature (2001)
 Here & Now, 2005 album by Malaysian band, Pop Shuvit
 Here & Now (America album) (2007)
 The Here and Now, a 2011 album by Architects
 Here & Now, an album by The Idea of North
 Here and Now (Charlie Major album)
 Here and Now (Nickelback album)
 Here and Now (Sky Cries Mary album), an album by Sky Cries Mary
 Here and Now, an album by Worlds Apart
 Here and Now (Darryl Worley album)
 Here and Now, an album by Jose Mari Chan, or its title song
 Here and Now, an album by Joe Dolan
 hERE aND nOW, an album by Peter Holsapple and Chris Stamey
 Here and Now (Kenny Chesney album), (2020)

EPs
 Here and Now (Gretta Ray EP) (2018)

Songs
 "Here and Now" (Luther Vandross song) (1989)
 "Here and Now" (Kenny Chesney song)
 "Here and Now" (Seether song)
 "Here and Now" / "You'll Be Sorry", a 2001 song by Steps
 "Here and Now", a song by Client from Client
 "Here and Now", a song by The Ernies from Meson Ray
 "Here and Now", a song by Great Big Sea from Fortune's Favour
 "Here and Now", a song by Hed PE from New World Orphans
 "Here & Now", a song by Letters To Cleo from Aurora Gory Alice
 "Here and Now", a song by Ride from Nowhere
 "Here and Now", a song by ZOEgirl from Life

Radio, television, and film
 Here and Now (Boston), an American public radio magazine program
 Here and Now (Toronto), a Canadian afternoon-drive radio program
 Here and Now (1955 TV series), a British sitcom featuring Hugh Paddick
 Here and Now (1961 TV series), an American series aired during the 1961-62 television season
 Here and Now (1970 film), a Canadian drama film
 Richard Pryor: Here and Now, a 1983 stand-up film and comedy album
 Here and Now (1992 TV series), a 1992-93 American sitcom
 Here and Now (1994 TV series), a UK current-affairs series presented by Juliet Morris
 Here and Now (2018 TV series), a 2018 American HBO drama series
 Hear and Now, a 2007 documentary by Irene Taylor Brodsky
 Here and Now (2018 film), an American romantic drama film
 Ellen DeGeneres: Here and Now, a series of television specials
 Here and Now (Central Independent Television), a UK multicultural programme produced by Zia Mohyeddin
 CBC News: Here & Now, the evening newscast of CBNT-DT, St. John's, Canada
Here and Now, a 2018 film by Israeli film director Roman Shumunov

Other uses
 Here and Now: Letters, 2008-2011, a collection of letters between Paul Auster and J. M. Coetzee
 Here and Now, a UK Situationist magazine whose contributors included Sadie Plant
 Monopoly Here and Now, a variant of Monopoly

See also
 Here and Now and Sounding Good!, a 1966 album by the Dick Morrissey Quartet